The following Confederate States Army units and commanders fought in the Battle of Seven Pines of the American Civil War. The Union order of battle is shown separately.

Abbreviations used

Military rank
 Gen = General
 MG = Major General
 BG = Brigadier General
 Col = Colonel
 Ltc = Lieutenant Colonel
 Maj = Major
 Cpt = Captain

Other
 (w) = wounded
 (mw) = mortally wounded
 (k) = killed in action
 (c) = captured

Army of Northern Virginia

Gen Joseph E. Johnston (w)

MG Gustavus W. Smith

Gen Robert E. Lee

Left Wing
MG Gustavus W. Smith

Right Wing
MG James Longstreet

Reserve
MG John B. Magruder

Notes

References
 

American Civil War orders of battle